Spencer James Ford (November 21, 1866 – October 8, 1927) was an American football player and coach.  He was the third head football coach
at Colgate University and he held that position for the 1894 season.
His coaching record at Colgate was 2–1–1. He later lived in Astoria, Queens.

Head coaching record

References

External links
 

1866 births
1927 deaths
19th-century players of American football
Colgate Raiders football coaches
Colgate Raiders football players
People from Astoria, Queens
People from Camden, New York
Coaches of American football from New York (state)
Players of American football from New York (state)